Arthur Blenkinsop (30 June 1911 – 23 September 1979) was a British Labour Party politician.

Blenkinsop was educated at the Royal Grammar School, Newcastle, and the College of Commerce, Newcastle-upon-Tyne, and became a chartered secretary.

At the 1945 general election, Blenkinsop was elected as Member of Parliament for Newcastle upon Tyne East. He was Parliamentary Secretary to the Ministry of Pensions (1946–1949) and to the Ministry of Health (1949–1951).

After losing his seat at the 1959 general election, he became a Newcastle City Councillor in 1961. At the 1964 general election, Blenkinsop returned to Parliament as the MP for South Shields, and held the seat until he stood down in at the 1979 general election.

He was President of the Public Health Inspectors Association, a governor of the British Film Institute and vice-president of the Ramblers Association. He became a member of the Medical Research Council in 1965.

He died four months after his retirement, aged 68. Arthur Blenkinsop is the great-uncle of Christopher Blenkinsop, founder and head of Berlin-based music group 17 Hippies.

References 
Times Guide to the House of Commons October 1974

External links 
 

1911 births
1979 deaths
Chairs of the Fabian Society
Councillors in Tyne and Wear
Labour Party (UK) MPs for English constituencies
Ministers in the Attlee governments, 1945–1951
People educated at the Royal Grammar School, Newcastle upon Tyne
UK MPs 1945–1950
UK MPs 1950–1951
UK MPs 1951–1955
UK MPs 1955–1959
UK MPs 1964–1966
UK MPs 1966–1970
UK MPs 1970–1974
UK MPs 1974
UK MPs 1974–1979